Takam-Chi (Azerbaijani: تکم چی), or Takam Gardān (meaning, the one who turns around the Takam), is the person who plays the Takam. Both Takam and Takam-Chi are Turkic-Azari words.

Takam-Chi is also the name of a recent Iranian motion picture (2008), directed by Yadollah Samadi. The dialogues of this film are partly in Azerbaijani and partly in Persian.

References
 The Anthropological Museum of the Tribes of Azarbaijan, Sarāb: English, Persian.

See also

Azerbaijani music
Azerbaijani culture
Nowruz